Baliati Zamindar Bari is in the village of Baliati, in Saturia Upazila in Manikganj District, Bangladesh. It is the palace of the Zamindars, the Baliati Zamindari who ruled over a large area.

History

Gobinda Ram Shaha was the settler of the Zamindari at Baliati. He was a salt merchant. He inherited the business from his parent, then he extended that business further and established the zamindari.
The zamindari extended to Narayanganj District.

Architecture

There are seven palaces. There are about 200 rooms inside the premises. At the back of the Palace is a pond (dighi).

Abolition
At the end of the 18th century, Zamindar Harendra Kumar Roy Chowdhury officially sold some parts of the Zamindari of Narayanganj to Sreemoti Alladi BiBi who was the owner of Talluk and her husband Zamindar Rahim Bakhsh Haji. The palaces have been administered by the Bangladesh archeological department since 1987. And it is said that after separation in 1947, all the ancestors left for India.

See also
 List of archaeological sites in Bangladesh

References

 
 
 The Grandeur of Baliati  The Daily Star, Published 1 April 2016 Retrieved 28 May 2017.
 Baliati Zamidar Bari  The Asian Age, Published 19 November 2016 Retrieved 20 November 2018.

Zamindari estates
Bengali zamindars